Madeay's emo skink (Emoia submetallica) is a species of lizard in the family Scincidae. It is found in Papua New Guinea.

References

Emoia
Reptiles described in 1877
Reptiles of Papua New Guinea
Endemic fauna of Papua New Guinea
Taxa named by William John Macleay
Skinks of New Guinea